Charbel Dabire (born January 15, 1997) is a Burkinabé professional Canadian football defensive lineman for the Saskatchewan Roughriders of the Canadian Football League (CFL). He played college football for Wagner and was drafted in the fifth round (44th overall) of the 2019 CFL Draft.

Early life and education
Charbel Dabire was born on January 15, 1997, in Burkina Faso. His family moved to Canada when he was young, and he attended Mount Carmel High School in Toronto. After a time at Mount Carmel, Dabire transferred to IMG Academy in Bradenton, Florida. After graduating high school, he spent 2015 with the New Mexico Military Institute junior college. He made 22 tackles during his freshman season.

Dabire transferred to Wagner University after one season in New Mexico. During his first year at Wagner, he played in 11 games and started six, making 25 total tackles and two sacks. As a junior, he played in all 11 games again, starting 3 of them. He finished the year with 22 tackles. He was named team captain prior to his senior year of 2018. As team captain, Dabire made a career-best 26 tackles, and recorded one 36-yard fumble return touchdown off a blocked punt.

Professional career
Following his senior year, Dabire was selected with the 44th pick of the 2019 CFL Draft by the Saskatchewan Roughriders. He previously had a pro day with the New York Giants of the National Football League (NFL), but was not selected in their draft. He signed his rookie contract with the Roughriders in May 2019. In his first season, Dabire appeared in 11 games, started one, and made seven tackles and a sack. He was re-signed in 2020, after the season was cancelled due to COVID-19. He played his first  game against the Hamilton Tiger-Cats in week two, making one tackle.

References

1997 births
Living people
Canadian football defensive linemen
American football defensive linemen
Wagner Seahawks football players
Burkinabé players of Canadian football
21st-century Burkinabé people
Saskatchewan Roughriders players
New Mexico Military Institute Broncos football players